Við Margáir is a stadium in Streymnes, Faroe Islands. It is currently used mostly for association football matches and is the home ground of EB/Streymur.

References

External links
 Við Margáir - Nordic Stadiums

EB/Streymur
Football venues in the Faroe Islands